Jamia Binoria Aalamia is an Islamic educational institute in Karachi, Sindh, Pakistan. It is regarded as one of the most modern madrassas. Noman Naeem is the principal (chancellor) of the seminary.

History
Jamia Binoria was founded by Mufti Muhammed Naeem in 1978 (Rajab 1398 AH). 
It is affiliated to Ittehad Tanzeematul Madaris-e-Deeniya (ITMD), a confederacy of five religious education boards. At one time, Jamiah Binoria is said to have had the highest enrollment of foreign students in Pakistan. The international enrollment dropped following the September 11, 2001 attacks. In 2005, it had around 3,000 male and 500 female students, including students from United States, Canada, United Kingdom, France, Germany and East Asia.
Jamia Binoria also has ifta courses for women, thereafter calling them "muftia" (female Muftis).

On 23 June 2020, Noman Naeem was appointed as the chancellor (or Principal) of the seminary following the death of his father Mufti Muhammad Naeem on 20 June 2020.

Departments
Jamia Binoria has the following departments: 
 Administration Department
 Computer Department
 Dar-ul-Iftaa Department
 Department of Books (Kutub)
 Department of Hifz-ul-Quran
 Department of Publication
 Department of Tajweed-ul-Quran
 Department of Takhassus
 Department of weekley akhbarul madaris
 Department of Writer
 Madrasa-tul-Banat (Female Section)
Department Fundraising (Call Center)

Chancellors
 Mufti Muhammad Naeem (died 20 June 2020)
 Noman Naeem (23 June 2020 – incumbent)

See also
 Darul 'Uloom Karachi

References

External links
 Jamia Binoria website
 Famous Islamic University In Pakistan
 International Binoria University & Binoria Welfare Trust
 An article in Newsline
 Quran Institute

Educational institutions established in 1978
Universities and colleges in Karachi
Deobandi Islamic universities and colleges
Islamic universities and colleges in Pakistan
1978 establishments in Pakistan
Private universities and colleges in Pakistan
Jamia Binoria